Nawazuddin Siddiqui (born 19 May 1974) is an Indian actor known for his work in Hindi cinema. He is an alumnus of the National School of Drama. Siddiqui's feature film debut was alongside director Prashant Bhargava in Patang (2012), and his performance was appreciated by cinema critic Roger Ebert. He also gained international recognition for his work with director Anurag Kashyap in Black Friday (2007), the Gangs of Wasseypur (2012), duology and Raman Raghav 2.0.

Siddiqui is best known for his roles in The Lunchbox (2013), Manto (2018), and Raman Raghav 2.0. He is the only actor in the world to have eight films officially selected and screened at the Cannes Film Festival.

The actor continues to take time out from his filming schedule to farm in his native Uttar Pradesh. He has starred in two Emmy-nominated series, Sacred Games (2019) and the British McMafia.

Filmography

Films

Web series

References

External links
 Nawazuddin Siddiqui filmography at IMDb

Indian filmographies
Male actor filmographies